Feardorcha Ó Mealláin was an Irish poet the reputed author of An Díbirt go Connachta. He is said to have been a Franciscan, possibly from County Down, but both of these claims are in doubt. It is suggested that his name may be a 'pet-name' for two of his kinsmen, Henry Ó Mealláin or Tarlach Ó Mealláin, who may also be its author.

See also

 Aodh Buidhe Mac an Bhaird
 Michael Shiell
 Luke Wadding
 Henry Ó Mealláin

References

 Charles Dillon, Cín Lae Uí Mhealláin, pp. 337–95 Tyrone:History and Society. 
 Diarmaid Ó Doibhlin (2000) Tyrone's Gaelic Literary Legacy, pp. 414–17, op.cit.

17th-century Irish writers
Irish-language poets
Irish poets
People of the Irish Confederate Wars
Year of birth unknown
Year of death unknown
Irish Franciscans